Whales are a widely distributed and diverse group of fully aquatic placental marine mammals. As an informal and colloquial grouping, they correspond to large members of the infraorder Cetacea, i.e. all cetaceans apart from dolphins and porpoises. Dolphins and porpoises may be considered whales from a formal, cladistic perspective. Whales, dolphins and porpoises belong to the order Cetartiodactyla, which consists of even-toed ungulates. Their closest non-cetacean living relatives are the hippopotamuses, from which they and other cetaceans diverged about 54 million years ago. The two parvorders of whales, baleen whales (Mysticeti) and toothed whales (Odontoceti), are thought to have had their last common ancestor around 34 million years ago. Mysticetes include four extant (living) families: Balaenopteridae (the rorquals), Balaenidae (right whales), Cetotheriidae (the pygmy right whale), and Eschrichtiidae (the grey whale). Odontocetes include the Monodontidae (belugas and narwhals), Physeteridae (the sperm whale), Kogiidae (the dwarf and pygmy sperm whale), and Ziphiidae (the beaked whales), as well as the six families of dolphins and porpoises which are not considered whales in the informal sense.

Whales are fully aquatic, open-ocean creatures: they can feed, mate, give birth, suckle and raise their young at sea. The sperm whale is the largest toothed predator on Earth. Several whale species exhibit sexual dimorphism, in that the females are larger than males.

Baleen whales have no teeth; instead, they have plates of baleen, fringe-like structures that enable them to expel the huge mouthfuls of water they take in while retaining the krill and plankton they feed on. Because their heads are enormous—making up as much as 40% of their total body mass—and they have throat pleats that enable them to expand their mouths, they are able to take huge quantities of water into their mouth at a time. Baleen whales also have a well-developed sense of smell.

Toothed whales, in contrast, have conical teeth adapted to catching fish or squid. They also have such keen hearing—whether above or below the surface of the water—that some can survive even if they are blind. Some species, such as sperm whales, are particularly well adapted for diving to great depths to catch squid and other favoured prey.

Whales evolved from land-living mammals, and must regularly surface to breathe air, although they can remain underwater for long periods of time. Some species, such as the sperm whale, can stay underwater for up to 90 minutes. They have blowholes (modified nostrils) located on top of their heads, through which air is taken in and expelled. They are warm-blooded, and have a layer of fat, or blubber, under the skin. With streamlined fusiform bodies and two limbs that are modified into flippers, whales can travel at speeds of up to 20 knots, though they are not as flexible or agile as seals. Whales produce a great variety of vocalizations, notably the extended songs of the humpback whale. Although whales are widespread, most species prefer the colder waters of the Northern and Southern Hemispheres and migrate to the equator to give birth. Species such as humpbacks and blue whales are capable of travelling thousands of miles without feeding. Males typically mate with multiple females every year, but females only mate every two to three years. Calves are typically born in the spring and summer; females bear all the responsibility for raising them. Mothers in some species fast and nurse their young for one to two years.

Once relentlessly hunted for their products, whales are now protected by international law. The North Atlantic right whales nearly became extinct in the twentieth century, with a population low of 450, and the North Pacific grey whale population is ranked Critically Endangered by the IUCN. Besides the threat from whalers, they also face threats from bycatch and marine pollution. The meat, blubber and baleen of whales have traditionally been used by indigenous peoples of the Arctic. Whales have been depicted in various cultures worldwide, notably by the Inuit and the coastal peoples of Vietnam and Ghana, who sometimes hold whale funerals. Whales occasionally feature in literature and film. A famous example is the great white whale in Herman Melville's novel Moby-Dick. Small whales, such as belugas, are sometimes kept in captivity and trained to perform tricks, but breeding success has been poor and the animals often die within a few months of capture. Whale watching has become a form of tourism around the world.

Etymology and definitions
The word "whale" comes from the Old English hwæl, from Proto-Germanic *hwalaz, from Proto-Indo-European *(s)kwal-o-, meaning "large sea fish". The Proto-Germanic *hwalaz is also the source of Old Saxon hwal, Old Norse hvalr, hvalfiskr, Swedish val, Middle Dutch wal, walvisc, Dutch walvis, Old High German wal, and German Wal. The obsolete "whalefish" has a similar derivation, indicating a time when whales were thought to be fish.  Other archaic English forms include wal, wale, whal, whalle, whaille, wheal, etc.

The term "whale" is sometimes used interchangeably with dolphins and porpoises, acting as a synonym for Cetacea. Six species of dolphins have the word "whale" in their name, collectively known as blackfish: the orca, or killer whale, the melon-headed whale, the pygmy killer whale, the false killer whale, and the two species of pilot whales, all of which are classified under the family Delphinidae (oceanic dolphins). Each species has a different reason for it, for example, the killer whale was named "Ballena asesina" 'killer whale' by Spanish sailors.

The term "Great Whales" covers those currently regulated by the International Whaling Commission: the Odontoceti family Physeteridae (sperm whales); and the Mysticeti families Balaenidae (right and bowhead whales), Eschrichtiidae (grey whales), and some of the Balaenopteridae (Minke, Bryde's, Sei, Blue and Fin; not Eden's and Omura's whales).

Taxonomy and evolution

Phylogeny
The whales are part of the largely terrestrial mammalian clade Laurasiatheria. Whales do not form a clade or order; the infraorder Cetacea includes dolphins and porpoises, which are not considered whales in the informal sense. The phylogenetic tree shows the relationships of whales and other mammals, with whale groups marked in green.

Cetaceans are divided into two parvorders. The larger parvorder, Mysticeti (baleen whales), is characterized by the presence of baleen, a sieve-like structure in the upper jaw made of keratin, which it uses to filter plankton, among others, from the water. Odontocetes (toothed whales) are characterized by bearing sharp teeth for hunting, as opposed to their counterparts' baleen.

Cetaceans and artiodactyls now are classified under the order Cetartiodactyla, often still referred to as Artiodactyla, which includes both whales and hippopotamuses. The hippopotamus and pygmy hippopotamus are the whales' closest terrestrial living relatives.

Mysticetes

Mysticetes are also known as baleen whales. They have a pair of blowholes side by side and lack teeth; instead they have baleen plates which form a sieve-like structure in the upper jaw made of keratin, which they use to filter plankton from the water. Some whales, such as the humpback, reside in the polar regions where they feed on a reliable source of schooling fish and krill. These animals rely on their well-developed flippers and tail fin to propel themselves through the water; they swim by moving their fore-flippers and tail fin up and down. Whale ribs loosely articulate with their thoracic vertebrae at the proximal end, but do not form a rigid rib cage. This adaptation allows the chest to compress during deep dives as the pressure increases. Mysticetes consist of four families: rorquals (balaenopterids), cetotheriids, right whales (balaenids), and grey whales (eschrichtiids).

The main difference between each family of mysticete is in their feeding adaptations and subsequent behaviour.
Balaenopterids are the rorquals. These animals, along with the cetotheriids, rely on their throat pleats to gulp large amounts of water while feeding. The throat pleats extend from the mouth to the navel and allow the mouth to expand to a large volume for more efficient capture of the small animals they feed on. Balaenopterids consist of two genera and eight species.
Balaenids are the right whales. These animals have very large heads, which can make up as much as 40% of their body mass, and much of the head is the mouth. This allows them to take in large amounts of water into their mouths, letting them feed more effectively.
Eschrichtiids have one living member: the grey whale. They are bottom feeders, mainly eating crustaceans and benthic invertebrates. They feed by turning on their sides and taking in water mixed with sediment, which is then expelled through the baleen, leaving their prey trapped inside. This is an efficient method of hunting, in which the whale has no major competitors.

Odontocetes

Odontocetes are known as toothed whales; they have teeth and only one blowhole. They rely on their well-developed sonar to find their way in the water. Toothed whales send out ultrasonic clicks using the melon. Sound waves travel through the water. Upon striking an object in the water, the sound waves bounce back at the whale. These vibrations are received through fatty tissues in the jaw, which is then rerouted into the ear-bone and into the brain where the vibrations are interpreted. All toothed whales are opportunistic, meaning they will eat anything they can fit in their throat because they are unable to chew. These animals rely on their well-developed flippers and tail fin to propel themselves through the water; they swim by moving their fore-flippers and tail fin up and down. Whale ribs loosely articulate with their thoracic vertebrae at the proximal end, but they do not form a rigid rib cage. This adaptation allows the chest to compress during deep dives as opposed to resisting the force of water pressure. Excluding dolphins and porpoises, odontocetes consist of four families: belugas and narwhals (monodontids), sperm whales (physeterids), dwarf and pygmy sperm whales (kogiids), and beaked whales (ziphiids).

The differences between families of odontocetes include size, feeding adaptations and distribution. Monodontids consist of two species: the beluga and the narwhal. They both reside in the frigid arctic and both have large amounts of blubber. Belugas, being white, hunt in large pods near the surface and around pack ice, their coloration acting as camouflage. Narwhals, being black, hunt in large pods in the aphotic zone, but their underbelly still remains white to remain camouflaged when something is looking directly up or down at them. They have no dorsal fin to prevent collision with pack ice.
Physeterids and Kogiids consist of sperm whales. Sperm whales consist the largest and smallest odontocetes, and spend a large portion of their life hunting squid. P. macrocephalus spends most of its life in search of squid in the depths; these animals do not require any degree of light at all, in fact, blind sperm whales have been caught in perfect health. The behaviour of Kogiids remains largely unknown, but, due to their small lungs, they are thought to hunt in the photic zone.
Ziphiids consist of 22 species of beaked whale. These vary from size, to coloration, to distribution, but they all share a similar hunting style. They use a suction technique, aided by a pair of grooves on the underside of their head, not unlike the throat pleats on the rorquals, to feed.

As a formal clade (a group which does not exclude any descendant taxon), odontocetes also contains the porpoises (Phocoenidae) and four or five living families of dolphins: oceanic dolphins (Delphinidae), South Asian river dolphins (Platanistidae), the possibly extinct Yangtze River dolphin (Lipotidae), South American river dolphins (Iniidae), and La Plata dolphin (Pontoporiidae).

Evolution

Whales are descendants of land-dwelling mammals of the artiodactyl order (even-toed ungulates). They are related to the Indohyus, an extinct chevrotain-like ungulate, from which they split approximately 48 million years ago. Primitive cetaceans, or archaeocetes, first took to the sea approximately 49 million years ago and became fully aquatic 5–10 million years later. What defines an archaeocete is the presence of anatomical features exclusive to cetaceans, alongside other primitive features not found in modern cetaceans, such as visible legs or asymmetrical teeth. Their features became adapted for living in the marine environment. Major anatomical changes included their hearing set-up that channeled vibrations from the jaw to the earbone (Ambulocetus 49 mya), a streamlined body and the growth of flukes on the tail (Protocetus 43 mya), the migration of the nostrils toward the top of the cranium (blowholes), and the modification of the forelimbs into flippers (Basilosaurus 35 mya), and the shrinking and eventual disappearance of the hind limbs (the first odontocetes and mysticetes 34 mya).

Whale morphology shows several examples of convergent evolution, the most obvious being the streamlined fish-like body shape. Other examples include the use of echolocation for hunting in low light conditions — which is the same hearing adaptation used by bats — and, in the rorqual whales, jaw adaptations, similar to those found in pelicans, that enable engulfment feeding.

Today, the closest living relatives of cetaceans are the hippopotamuses; these share a semi-aquatic ancestor that branched off from other artiodactyls some 60 mya. Around 40 mya, a common ancestor between the two branched off into cetacea and anthracotheres; nearly all anthracotheres became extinct at the end of the Pleistocene 2.5 mya, eventually leaving only one surviving lineage – the hippopotamus.

Whales split into two separate parvorders around 34 mya – the baleen whales (Mysticetes) and the toothed whales (Odontocetes).

Biology

Anatomy

Whales have torpedo-shaped bodies with non-flexible necks, limbs modified into flippers, non-existent external ear flaps, a large tail fin, and flat heads (with the exception of monodontids and ziphiids). Whale skulls have small eye orbits, long snouts (with the exception of monodontids and ziphiids) and eyes placed on the sides of its head. Overall, they tend to dwarf other cetartiodactyls; the blue whale is the largest creature on Earth. Several species have female-biased sexual dimorphism, with the females being larger than the males. One exception is with the sperm whale, which has males larger than the females.

Odontocetes, such as the sperm whale, possess teeth with cementum cells overlying dentine cells. Unlike human teeth, which are composed mostly of enamel on the portion of the tooth outside of the gum, whale teeth have cementum outside the gum. Only in larger whales, where the cementum is worn away on the tip of the tooth, does enamel show. Mysticetes have large whalebone, as opposed to teeth, made of keratin. Mysticetes have two blowholes, whereas Odontocetes contain only one.

Spout shapes differ among species, which facilitates identification.

All whales have a thick layer of blubber. This blubber can help with buoyancy (which is helpful for a 100-ton whale), protection to some extent as predators would have a hard time getting through a thick layer of fat, and energy for fasting when migrating to the equator; the primary usage for blubber is insulation from the harsh climate. It can constitute as much as 50% of a whale's body weight. Calves are born with only a thin layer of blubber, but some species compensate for this with thick lanugos.

Whales have a two- to three-chambered stomach that is similar in structure to those of terrestrial carnivores. Mysticetes contain a proventriculus as an extension of the oesophagus; this contains stones that grind up food. They also have fundic and pyloric chambers.

Locomotion

Whales have two flippers on the front, and a tail fin. These flippers contain four digits. Although whales do not possess fully developed hind limbs, some, such as the sperm whale and bowhead whale, possess discrete rudimentary appendages, which may contain feet and digits. The fusing of the neck vertebrae, while increasing stability when swimming at high speeds, decreases flexibility; whales are unable to turn their heads. When swimming, whales rely on their tail fin to propel them through the water. Flipper movement is continuous. Whales swim by moving their tail fin and lower body up and down, propelling themselves through vertical movement, while their flippers are mainly used for steering. Some species log out of the water, which may allow them to travel faster. Their skeletal anatomy allows them to be fast swimmers. Most species have a dorsal fin.

Whales are adapted for diving to great depths. In addition to their streamlined bodies, they can slow their heart rate to conserve oxygen; blood is rerouted from tissue tolerant of water pressure to the heart and brain among other organs; haemoglobin and myoglobin store oxygen in body tissue; and they have twice the concentration of myoglobin than haemoglobin. Before going on long dives, many whales exhibit a behaviour known as sounding; they stay close to the surface for a series of short, shallow dives while building their oxygen reserves, and then make a sounding dive.

Senses

The whale ear has specific adaptations to the marine environment. In humans, the middle ear works as an impedance equalizer between the outside air's low impedance and the cochlear fluid's high impedance. In whales, and other marine mammals, there is no great difference between the outer and inner environments. Instead of sound passing through the outer ear to the middle ear, whales receive sound through the throat, from which it passes through a low-impedance fat-filled cavity to the inner ear. The whale ear is acoustically isolated from the skull by air-filled sinus pockets, which allow for greater directional hearing underwater. Odontocetes send out high-frequency clicks from an organ known as a melon. This melon consists of fat, and the skull of any such creature containing a melon will have a large depression. The melon size varies between species, the bigger the more dependent they are on it. A beaked whale for example has a small bulge sitting on top of its skull, whereas a sperm whale's head is filled up mainly with the melon.

The whale eye is relatively small for its size, yet they do retain a good degree of eyesight. As well as this, the eyes of a whale are placed on the sides of its head, so their vision consists of two fields, rather than a binocular view like humans have. When belugas surface, their lens and cornea correct the nearsightedness that results from the refraction of light; they contain both rod and cone cells, meaning they can see in both dim and bright light, but they have far more rod cells than they do cone cells. Whales do, however, lack short wavelength sensitive visual pigments in their cone cells indicating a more limited capacity for colour vision than most mammals. Most whales have slightly flattened eyeballs, enlarged pupils (which shrink as they surface to prevent damage), slightly flattened corneas and a tapetum lucidum; these adaptations allow for large amounts of light to pass through the eye and, therefore, a very clear image of the surrounding area. They also have glands on the eyelids and outer corneal layer that act as protection for the cornea.

The olfactory lobes are absent in toothed whales, suggesting that they have no sense of smell. Some whales, such as the bowhead whale, possess a vomeronasal organ, which does mean that they can "sniff out" krill.

Whales are not thought to have a good sense of taste, as their taste buds are atrophied or missing altogether. However, some toothed whales have preferences between different kinds of fish, indicating some sort of attachment to taste. The presence of the Jacobson's organ indicates that whales can smell food once inside their mouth, which might be similar to the sensation of taste.

Communication

Whale vocalization is likely to serve several purposes. Some species, such as the humpback whale, communicate using melodic sounds, known as whale song. These sounds may be extremely loud, depending on the species. Humpback whales only have been heard making clicks, while toothed whales use sonar that may generate up to 20,000 watts of sound (+73 dBm or +43 dBw) and be heard for many miles.

Captive whales have occasionally been known to mimic human speech. Scientists have suggested this indicates a strong desire on behalf of the whales to communicate with humans, as whales have a very different vocal mechanism, so imitating human speech likely takes considerable effort.

Whales emit two distinct kinds of acoustic signals, which are called whistles and clicks:
Clicks are quick broadband burst pulses, used for sonar, although some lower-frequency broadband vocalizations may serve a non-echolocative purpose such as communication; for example, the pulsed calls of belugas. Pulses in a click train are emitted at intervals of ≈35–50 milliseconds, and in general these inter-click intervals are slightly greater than the round-trip time of sound to the target.
Whistles are narrow-band frequency modulated (FM) signals, used for communicative purposes, such as contact calls.

Intelligence

Whales are known to teach, learn, cooperate, scheme, and grieve. The neocortex of many species of whale is home to elongated spindle neurons that, prior to 2007, were known only in hominids. In humans, these cells are involved in social conduct, emotions, judgement, and theory of mind. Whale spindle neurons are found in areas of the brain that are homologous to where they are found in humans, suggesting that they perform a similar function.

Brain size was previously considered a major indicator of the intelligence of an animal. Since most of the brain is used for maintaining bodily functions, greater ratios of brain-to-body mass may increase the amount of brain mass available for more complex cognitive tasks. Allometric analysis indicates that mammalian brain size scales at approximately the ⅔ or ¾ exponent of the body mass. Comparison of a particular animal's brain size with the expected brain size based on such allometric analysis provides an encephalisation quotient that can be used as another indication of animal intelligence. The brain-to-body mass ratio in some odontocetes, such as belugas and narwhals, is second only to humans.

Small whales are known to engage in complex play behaviour, which includes such things as producing stable underwater toroidal air-core vortex rings or "bubble rings". There are two main methods of bubble ring production: rapid puffing of a burst of air into the water and allowing it to rise to the surface, forming a ring, or swimming repeatedly in a circle and then stopping to inject air into the helical vortex currents thus formed. They also appear to enjoy biting the vortex-rings, so that they burst into many separate bubbles and then rise quickly to the surface. Some believe this is a means of communication. Whales are also known to produce bubble-nets for the purpose of foraging.

Larger whales are also thought, to some degree, to engage in play. The southern right whale, for example, elevates their tail fluke above the water, remaining in the same position for a considerable amount of time. This is known as "sailing". It appears to be a form of play and is most commonly seen off the coast of Argentina and South Africa. Humpback whales, among others, are also known to display this behaviour.

Life cycle

Whales are fully aquatic creatures, which means that birth and courtship behaviours are very different from terrestrial and semi-aquatic creatures. Since they are unable to go onto land to calve, they deliver the baby with the fetus positioned for tail-first delivery. This prevents the baby from drowning either upon or during delivery. To feed the newborn, whales, being aquatic, must squirt the milk into the mouth of the calf. Being mammals, they have mammary glands used for nursing calves; they are weaned off at about 11 months of age. This milk contains high amounts of fat which is meant to hasten the development of blubber; it contains so much fat that it has the consistency of toothpaste. Females deliver a single calf with gestation lasting about a year, dependency until one to two years, and maturity around seven to ten years, all varying between the species. This mode of reproduction produces few offspring, but increases the survival probability of each one. Females, referred to as "cows", carry the responsibility of childcare as males, referred to as "bulls", play no part in raising calves.

Most mysticetes reside at the poles. So, to prevent the unborn calf from dying of frostbite, they migrate to calving/mating grounds. They will then stay there for a matter of months until the calf has developed enough blubber to survive the bitter temperatures of the poles. Until then, the calves will feed on the mother's fatty milk. With the exception of the humpback whale, it is largely unknown when whales migrate. Most will travel from the Arctic or Antarctic into the tropics to mate, calve, and raise during the winter and spring; they will migrate back to the poles in the warmer summer months so the calf can continue growing while the mother can continue eating, as they fast in the breeding grounds. One exception to this is the southern right whale, which migrates to Patagonia and western New Zealand to calve; both are well out of the tropic zone.

Sleep

Unlike most animals, whales are conscious breathers. All mammals sleep, but whales cannot afford to become unconscious for long because they may drown. While knowledge of sleep in wild cetaceans is limited, toothed cetaceans in captivity have been recorded to sleep with one side of their brain at a time, so that they may swim, breathe consciously, and avoid both predators and social contact during their period of rest.

A 2008 study found that sperm whales sleep in vertical postures just under the surface in passive shallow 'drift-dives', generally during the day, during which whales do not respond to passing vessels unless they are in contact, leading to the suggestion that whales possibly sleep during such dives.

Ecology

Foraging and predation

All whales are carnivorous and predatory. Odontocetes, as a whole, mostly feed on fish and cephalopods, and then followed by crustaceans and bivalves. All species are generalist and opportunistic feeders. Mysticetes, as a whole, mostly feed on krill and plankton, followed by crustaceans and other invertebrates. A few are specialists. Examples include the blue whale, which eats almost exclusively krill, the minke whale, which eats mainly schooling fish, the sperm whale, which specialize on squid, and the grey whale which feed on bottom-dwelling invertebrates. The elaborate baleen "teeth" of filter-feeding species, mysticetes, allow them to remove water before they swallow their planktonic food by using the teeth as a sieve. Usually, whales hunt solitarily, but they do sometimes hunt cooperatively in small groups. The former behaviour is typical when hunting non-schooling fish, slow-moving or immobile invertebrates or endothermic prey. When large amounts of prey are available, whales such as certain mysticetes hunt cooperatively in small groups. Some cetaceans may forage with other kinds of animals, such as other species of whales or certain species of pinnipeds.

Large whales, such as mysticetes, are not usually subject to predation, but smaller whales, such as monodontids or ziphiids, are. These species are preyed on by the otv or orca. To subdue and kill whales, orcas continuously ram them with their heads; this can sometimes kill bowhead whales, or severely injure them. Other times they corral the narwhals or belugas before striking. They are typically hunted by groups of 10 or fewer orcas, but they are seldom attacked by an individual. Calves are more commonly taken by orcas, but adults can be targeted as well.

These small whales are also targeted by terrestrial and pagophilic predators. The polar bear is well adapted for hunting Arctic whales and calves. Bears are known to use sit-and-wait tactics as well as active stalking and pursuit of prey on ice or water. Whales lessen the chance of predation by gathering in groups. This however means less room around the breathing hole as the ice slowly closes the gap. When out at sea, whales dive out of the reach of surface-hunting orcas. Polar bear attacks on belugas and narwhals are usually successful in winter, but rarely inflict any damage in summer.

Whale pump

A 2010 study considered whales to be a positive influence to the productivity of ocean fisheries, in what has been termed a "whale pump." Whales carry nutrients such as nitrogen from the depths back to the surface. This functions as an upward biological pump, reversing an earlier presumption that whales accelerate the loss of nutrients to the bottom. This nitrogen input in the Gulf of Maine is "more than the input of all rivers combined" emptying into the gulf, some  each year. Whales defecate at the ocean's surface; their excrement is important for fisheries because it is rich in iron and nitrogen. The whale faeces are liquid and instead of sinking, they stay at the surface where phytoplankton feed off it.

Whale fall

Upon death, whale carcasses fall to the deep ocean and provide a substantial habitat for marine life. Evidence of whale falls in present-day and fossil records shows that deep sea whale falls support a rich assemblage of creatures, with a global diversity of 407 species, comparable to other neritic biodiversity hotspots, such as cold seeps and hydrothermal vents.

Deterioration of whale carcasses happens though a series of three stages. Initially, moving organisms such as sharks and hagfish, scavenge the soft tissues at a rapid rate over a period of months, and as long as two years. This is followed by the colonization of bones and surrounding sediments (which contain organic matter) by enrichment opportunists, such as crustaceans and polychaetes, throughout a period of years. Finally, sulfophilic bacteria reduce the bones releasing hydrogen sulfide enabling the growth of chemoautotrophic organisms, which in turn, support other organisms such as mussels, clams, limpets, and sea snails. This stage may last for decades and supports a rich assemblage of species, averaging 185 species per site.

Relationship with humans

Whaling

Whaling by humans has existed since the Stone Age. Ancient whalers used harpoons to spear the bigger animals from boats out at sea. People from Norway and Japan started hunting whales around 2000 B.C. Whales are typically hunted for their meat and blubber by aboriginal groups; they used baleen for baskets or roofing, and made tools and masks out of bones. The Inuit hunted whales in the Arctic Ocean. The Basques started whaling as early as the 11th century, sailing as far as Newfoundland in the 16th century in search of right whales. 18th- and 19th-century whalers hunted whales mainly for their oil, which was used as lamp fuel and a lubricant, baleen or whalebone, which was used for items such as corsets and skirt hoops, and ambergris, which was used as a fixative for perfumes. The most successful whaling nations at this time were the Netherlands, Japan, and the United States.

Commercial whaling was historically important as an industry well throughout the 17th, 18th and 19th centuries. Whaling was at that time a sizeable European industry with ships from Britain, France, Spain, Denmark, the Netherlands and Germany, sometimes collaborating to hunt whales in the Arctic, sometimes in competition leading even to war. By the early 1790s, whalers, namely the Americans and Australians, focused efforts in the South Pacific where they mainly hunted sperm whales and right whales, with catches of up to 39,000 right whales by Americans alone. By 1853, US profits reached US$11,000,000 (£6.5m), equivalent to US$348,000,000 (£230m) today, the most profitable year for the American whaling industry. Commonly exploited species included North Atlantic right whales, sperm whales, which were mainly hunted by Americans, bowhead whales, which were mainly hunted by the Dutch, common minke whales, blue whales, and grey whales. The scale of whale harvesting decreased substantially after 1982 when the International Whaling Commission (IWC) placed a moratorium which set a catch limit for each country, excluding aboriginal groups until 2004.

Current whaling nations are Norway, Iceland, and Japan, despite their joining to the IWC, as well as the aboriginal communities of Siberia, Alaska, and northern Canada. Subsistence hunters typically use whale products for themselves and depend on them for survival. National and international authorities have given special treatment to aboriginal hunters since their methods of hunting are seen as less destructive and wasteful. This distinction is being questioned as these aboriginal groups are using more modern weaponry and mechanized transport to hunt with, and are selling whale products in the marketplace. Some anthropologists argue that the term "subsistence" should also apply to these cash-based exchanges as long as they take place within local production and consumption. In 1946, the IWC placed a moratorium, limiting the annual whale catch. Since then, yearly profits for these "subsistence" hunters have been close to US$31 million (£20m) per year.

Other threats

Whales can also be threatened by humans more indirectly. They are unintentionally caught in fishing nets by commercial fisheries as bycatch and accidentally swallow fishing hooks. Gillnetting and Seine netting is a significant cause of mortality in whales and other marine mammals. Species commonly entangled include beaked whales. Whales are also affected by marine pollution. High levels of organic chemicals accumulate in these animals since they are high in the food chain. They have large reserves of blubber, more so for toothed whales as they are higher up the food chain than baleen whales. Lactating mothers can pass the toxins on to their young. These pollutants can cause gastrointestinal cancers and greater vulnerability to infectious diseases. They can also be poisoned by swallowing litter, such as plastic bags. Advanced military sonar harms whales. Sonar interferes with the basic biological functions of whales—such as feeding and mating—by impacting their ability to echolocate. Whales swim in response to sonar and sometimes experience decompression sickness due to rapid changes in depth. Mass strandings have been triggered by sonar activity, resulting in injury or death. Whales are sometimes killed or injured during collisions with ships or boats. This is considered to be a significant threat to vulnerable whale populations such as the North Atlantic right whale, whose total population numbers less than 500.

Conservation

Whaling decreased substantially after 1946 when, in response to the steep decline in whale populations, the International Whaling Commission placed a moratorium which set a catch limit for each country; this excluded aboriginal groups up until 2004. As of 2015, aboriginal communities are allowed to take 280 bowhead whales off Alaska and two from the western coast of Greenland, 620 grey whales off Washington state, three common minke whales off the eastern coast of Greenland and 178 on their western coast, 10 fin whales from the west coast of Greenland, nine humpback whales from the west coast of Greenland and 20 off St. Vincent and the Grenadines each year. Several species that were commercially exploited have rebounded in numbers; for example, grey whales may be as numerous as they were prior to harvesting, but the North Atlantic population is functionally extinct. Conversely, the North Atlantic right whale was extirpated from much of its former range, which stretched across the North Atlantic, and only remains in small fragments along the coast of Canada, Greenland, and is considered functionally extinct along the European coastline.

The IWC has designated two whale sanctuaries: the Southern Ocean Whale Sanctuary, and the Indian Ocean Whale Sanctuary. The Southern Ocean whale sanctuary spans  and envelopes Antarctica. The Indian Ocean whale sanctuary takes up all of the Indian Ocean south of 55°S. The IWC is a voluntary organization, with no treaty. Any nation may leave as they wish; the IWC cannot enforce any law it makes.

There are at least 86 cetacean species that are recognized by the International Whaling Commission Scientific Committee. , six are considered at risk, as they are ranked "Critically Endangered" (North Atlantic right whale), "Endangered" (blue whale, North Pacific right whale, and sei whale), and "Vulnerable" (fin whale and sperm whale). Twenty-one species have a "Data Deficient" ranking. Species that live in polar habitats are vulnerable to the effects of recent and ongoing climate change, particularly the time when pack ice forms and melts.

Whale watching

An estimated 13 million people went whale watching globally in 2008, in all oceans except the Arctic. Rules and codes of conduct have been created to minimize harassment of the whales. Iceland, Japan and Norway have both whaling and whale watching industries. Whale watching lobbyists are concerned that the most inquisitive whales, which approach boats closely and provide much of the entertainment on whale-watching trips, will be the first to be taken if whaling is resumed in the same areas. Whale watching generated US$2.1 billion (£1.4 billion) per annum in tourism revenue worldwide, employing around 13,000 workers. In contrast, the whaling industry, with the moratorium in place, generates US$31 million (£20 million) per year. The size and rapid growth of the industry has led to complex and continuing debates with the whaling industry about the best use of whales as a natural resource.

In myth, literature and art

As marine creatures that reside in either the depths or the poles, humans knew very little about whales over the course of human history; many feared or revered them. The Vikings and various arctic tribes revered the whale as they were important pieces of their lives. In Inuit creation myths, when 'Big Raven', a deity in human form, found a stranded whale, he was told by the Great Spirit where to find special mushrooms that would give him the strength to drag the whale back to the sea and thus, return order to the world. In an Icelandic legend, a man threw a stone at a fin whale and hit the blowhole, causing the whale to burst. The man was told not to go to sea for twenty years, but during the nineteenth year he went fishing and a whale came and killed him.

Whales played a major part in shaping the art forms of many coastal civilizations, such as the Norse, with some dating to the Stone Age. Petroglyphs off a cliff face in Bangudae, South Korea show 300 depictions of various animals, a third of which are whales. Some show particular detail in which there are throat pleats, typical of rorquals. These petroglyphs show these people, of around 7,000 to 3,500 B.C.E. in South Korea, had a very high dependency on whales.

The Pacific Islanders and Australian Aborigines viewed whales as bringers of good and joy. One exception is French Polynesia, where, in many parts, cetaceans are met with great brutality.

In coastal regions of China, Korea and Vietnam, the worship of whale gods, who were associated with Dragon Kings after the arrival of Buddhism, was present along with related legends.

In Vietnam and Ghana, among other places, whales hold a sense of divinity. They are so respected in their cultures that they occasionally hold funerals for beached whales, a throwback to Vietnam's ancient sea-based Austro-Asiatic culture. The god of the seas, according to Chinese folklore, was a large whale with human limbs.

Whales have also played a role in sacred texts. The story of Jonah being swallowed by a great fish is told both in the Qur'an and in the biblical Book of Jonah (and is mentioned by Jesus in the New Testament: Matthew 12:40.). This episode was frequently depicted in medieval art (for example, on a 12th-century column capital at the abbey church of Mozac, France). The Bible also mentions whales in Genesis 1:21, Job 7:12, and Ezekiel 32:2. The "leviathan" described at length in Job 41:1-34 is generally understood to refer to a whale. The "sea monsters" in Lamentations 4:3 have been taken by some to refer to marine mammals, in particular whales, although most modern versions use the word "jackals" instead.

In 1585, Alessandro Farnese, 1585, and Francois, Duke of Anjou, 1582, were greeted on his ceremonial entry into the port city of Antwerp by floats including "Neptune and the Whale", indicating at least the city's dependence on the sea for its wealth.

In 1896, an article in The Pall Mall Gazette popularised a practice of alternative medicine that probably began in the whaling town of Eden, Australia two or three years earlier. It was believed that climbing inside a whale carcass and remaining there for a few hours would relieve symptoms of rheumatism.

Whales continue to be prevalent in modern literature. For example, Herman Melville's Moby Dick features a "great white whale" as the main antagonist for Ahab. The whale is an albino sperm whale, considered by Melville to be the largest type of whale, and is partly based on the historically attested bull whale Mocha Dick. Rudyard Kipling's Just So Stories includes the story of "How the Whale got in his Throat". A whale features in the award-winning children's book The Snail and the Whale (2003) by Julia Donaldson and Axel Scheffler.

Niki Caro's film the Whale Rider has a Māori girl ride a whale in her journey to be a suitable heir to the chieftain-ship. Walt Disney's film Pinocchio features a showdown with a giant whale named Monstro at the end of the film.

A recording of Song with a Humpback Whale by a team of marine scientists became popular in 1970. Alan Hovhaness's orchestral composition And God Created Great Whales (1970) includes the recorded sounds of humpback and bowhead whales. Recorded whale songs also appear in a number of other musical works, including Léo Ferré's song "Il n'y a plus rien" and Judy Collins's "Farewell to Tarwathie" (on the 1970 album Whales and Nightingales).

In captivity

Belugas were the first whales to be kept in captivity. Other species were too rare, too shy, or too big. The first beluga was shown at Barnum's Museum in New York City in 1861. For most of the 20th century, Canada was the predominant source of wild belugas. They were taken from the St. Lawrence River estuary until the late 1960s, after which they were predominantly taken from the Churchill River estuary until capture was banned in 1992. Russia has become the largest provider since it had been banned in Canada. Belugas are caught in the Amur River delta and their eastern coast, and then are either transported domestically to aquariums or dolphinariums in Moscow, St. Petersburg, and Sochi, or exported to other countries, such as Canada. Most captive belugas are caught in the wild, since captive-breeding programs are not very successful.

As of 2006, 30 belugas were in Canada and 28 in the United States, and 42 deaths in captivity had been reported up to that time. A single specimen can reportedly fetch up to US$100,000 (£64,160) on the market. The beluga's popularity is due to its unique colour and its facial expressions. The latter is possible because while most cetacean "smiles" are fixed, the extra movement afforded by the beluga's unfused cervical vertebrae allows a greater range of apparent expression.

Between 1960 and 1992, the Navy carried out a program that included the study of marine mammals' abilities with sonar, with the objective of improving the detection of underwater objects. A large number of belugas were used from 1975 on, the first being dolphins. The program also included training them to carry equipment and material to divers working underwater by holding cameras in their mouths to locate lost objects, survey ships and submarines, and underwater monitoring. A similar program was used by the Russian Navy during the Cold War, in which belugas were also trained for antimining operations in the Arctic.

Aquariums have tried housing other species of whales in captivity. The success of belugas turned attention to maintaining their relative, the narwhal, in captivity. However, in repeated attempts in the 1960s and 1970s, all narwhals kept in captivity died within months. A pair of pygmy right whales were retained in an enclosed area (with nets); they were eventually released in South Africa. There was one attempt to keep a stranded Sowerby's beaked whale calf in captivity; the calf rammed into the tank wall, breaking its rostrum, which resulted in death. It was thought that Sowerby's beaked whale evolved to swim fast in a straight line, and a  tank was not big enough. There have been attempts to keep baleen whales in captivity. There were three attempts to keep grey whales in captivity. Gigi was a grey whale calf that died in transport. Gigi II was another grey whale calf that was captured in the Ojo de Liebre Lagoon, and was transported to SeaWorld. The  calf was a popular attraction, and behaved normally, despite being separated from his mother. A year later, the  whale grew too big to keep in captivity and was released; it was the first of two grey whales, the other being another grey whale calf named JJ, to successfully be kept in captivity. There were three attempts to keep minke whales in captivity in Japan. They were kept in a tidal pool with a sea-gate at the Izu Mito Sea Paradise. Another, unsuccessful, attempt was made by the U.S.  One stranded humpback whale calf was kept in captivity for rehabilitation, but died days later.

See also
 List of individual cetaceans
 Whaling in Japan

References

Bibliography

Books

Articles

Websites

News

Other

Further reading

 
 
 

Cetaceans
 
Paraphyletic groups